Stuart Grimson (born May 20, 1965) is a Canadian former professional ice hockey player. Grimson played in the National Hockey League from 1989 to 2002.  During this time, he played for the Calgary Flames, Chicago Blackhawks, Mighty Ducks of Anaheim, Detroit Red Wings, Hartford Whalers/Carolina Hurricanes, Los Angeles Kings, and Nashville Predators.  Grimson was born in Vancouver, British Columbia, but grew up in Kamloops, British Columbia.

Playing career 
Grimson was known as an enforcer, with over 2,000 penalty minutes in his career.  His stature, his reputation as a fighter, and a play on his surname combined to earn him the nickname "The Grim Reaper." In his final season, in Nashville, he suffered from post-concussion syndrome and was forced to retire after a fight with Georges Laraque of the Edmonton Oilers. He had already been suffering effects before that bout, and even admitted he once blacked out in the middle of a fight.

His final NHL game was on December 12, 2001, and he officially announced his retirement on June 1, 2003.

Personal life 

Despite his fearsome reputation on the ice, Grimson won respect as an intelligent and articulate man off it. He became a born-again Christian in the early 1990s and led the NHL's Christian Fellowship ("Jesus was no wimp", Grimson said in one interview).

After retiring, Grimson finished his undergraduate degree and began law school. He completed his Juris Doctor degree in December 2005 at the University of Memphis Law School. He was In-House Counsel for the National Hockey League Players' Association (2006–2008) and then worked for the Nashville law firm of Kay, Griffin, Enkema & Brothers, PLLC (2008–2012). He worked as a Color Analyst for the Nashville Predators on Fox Sports South and the team's flagship network, 102.5 The Game, through the 2016–17 season.

Grimson appeared in a 2001 commercial spot for The Foundation for a Better Life. It begins with on-ice game action leading up to an intermission. While in the locker room with the team, Grimson receives a phone call. It is revealed that the caller is Grimson's young daughter, who asks him to sing "Itsy Bitsy Spider". He reluctantly complies, much to the amusement of his teammates. Grimson replies "Hey, it's my girl! You know, my daughter?" The commercial showed a softer side of Grimson as a good family man.

During an October 6, 2011, edition of Hockey Night In Canada, Don Cherry accused Grimson, along with Chris Nilan and Jim Thomson, of being 'pukes' and 'hypocrites' for supposedly making a living as an enforcers and now complaining about it. Grimson, by then a licensed attorney, indicated that he considered legal action against Don Cherry on behalf of himself, Chris Nilan and Jim Thomson citing Cherry's claims as "baseless and slanderous".  After an apology on Hockey Night in Canada by Cherry, Grimson reconsidered his lawsuit against Cherry stating that "This is a decision for Canadians. The CBC is your network; you pay for it. And you hold the network to certain standards and values."

Grimson has four children with his ex-wife Pam; Erin, Hannah, Kristjan and Jayne.

In 2018, Stu married Jennifer Ives Grimson, an entrepreneur and investor. They live in Nashville, Tennessee.

Career statistics

Regular season and playoffs

Filmography

See also
List of NHL players with 2000 career penalty minutes

References

External links 

hockey draft central

1965 births
Living people
Athabasca University alumni
Calgary Flames draft picks
Calgary Flames players
Canadian Christians
Canadian expatriate ice hockey players in the United States
Canadian ice hockey left wingers
Chicago Blackhawks players
Carolina Hurricanes players
Detroit Red Wings draft picks
Detroit Red Wings players
Hartford Whalers players
Indianapolis Ice players
Los Angeles Kings players
Manitoba Bisons ice hockey players
Mighty Ducks of Anaheim players
Nashville Predators announcers
Nashville Predators players
National Hockey League broadcasters
Regina Pats players
Salt Lake Golden Eagles (IHL) players
Sportspeople from Kamloops
Ice hockey people from Vancouver
University of Memphis alumni